Baykal class is a class of Russian river passenger ships. It is named after Baikal.

Two-deck cargo-passenger ships were built by VEB Warnowwerft Warnemünde, at their shipyard in Warnemünde, in East Germany in 1953–1956.

River cruise ships of the project 646

See also
 Rossiya-class motorship (1952)
 Rossiya-class motorship (1973)
 Dmitriy Furmanov-class motorship
 Valerian Kuybyshev-class motorship
 Rodina-class motorship
 Anton Chekhov-class motorship
 Maksim Gorkiy-class motorship
 Sergey Yesenin-class motorship
 Oktyabrskaya Revolyutsiya-class motorship
 Yerofey Khabarov-class motorship

References

River cruise ships
Ships of Russia
Ships of the Soviet Union
Germany–Soviet Union relations